General Sir William Thomas Knollys  (1 August 1797 – 23 June 1883) was a British Army officer who reached high office in the 1860s.

Military career
Born into the Knollys family, he was the son of General William Woods Knollys and Charlotte Martha Blackwell. He was educated at Harrow School and the Royal Military Academy Sandhurst. He was styled Viscount Wallingford until 1813, when his father's claim to the Earldom of Banbury was rejected.

Knollys was commissioned into the 3rd Foot Guards in 1813 and fought in the Peninsular War later that year. In 1854 he was appointed Lieutenant Governor of Guernsey and then in 1855 he became the first General Officer Commanding Aldershot Division and was allocated the task of organising his troops into Divisions and Brigades. Having achieved this task he was made President of the Council of Military Education in 1861.

He held the colonelcy of the 62nd (Wiltshire) Regiment of Foot from 1858 until its amalgamation into the Duke of Edinburgh's (Wiltshire Regiment) in 1881, after which he was Colonel of the 1st Battalion of the new Regiment. He transferred as Colonel to the Scots Guards in 1883 but died later the same year.

In 1862 he was appointed Treasurer and Comptroller to the Household of Prince of Wales, later King Edward VII. He was sworn in as Privy Counsellor in 1872 and in 1877 made Gentleman Usher of the Black Rod.

He was promoted to full General on 17 June 1866 and made a Knight Commander of the Order of the Bath (KCB) in 1867.

After his death in 1883 at the House of Lords he was buried at Highgate Cemetery (east side).

Family
In 1830 he married Elizabeth St Aubyn, daughter of Sir John St Aubyn, 5th Baronet, and together they went on to have five sons and three daughters.

One of his sons, Francis Knollys, 1st Viscount Knollys (1837–1924), was private secretary to Edward VII and George V and created Baron Knollys in 1902 and Viscount Knollys in 1911. Another son, Sir Henry Knollys (1840–1930), became private secretary to King Edward's daughter Maud, Queen of Norway.

References

|-

|-

 

|-

|-

|-

|-

1797 births
1883 deaths
People educated at Harrow School
Graduates of the Royal Military College, Sandhurst
British Army generals
Scots Guards officers
British Army personnel of the Napoleonic Wars
Ushers of the Black Rod
Burials at Highgate Cemetery
Knights Commander of the Order of the Bath
Members of the Privy Council of the United Kingdom
Grooms of the Stool